Below is the list of earthquakes in Moldova stronger than 5.0Mw

References

Geography of Moldova
Moldova
Earthquakes